Deborah "Debbie" Hill (born 21 June 1960) is a British former swimmer. She competed in two events at the 1976 Summer Olympics. At the 1980 Summer Olympics she represented Zimbabwe in the women's 3 metre springboard.

She also won the 1975 ASA National Championship 100 metres freestyle title.

References

External links
 

1960 births
Living people
British female swimmers
Zimbabwean female divers
Olympic swimmers of Great Britain
Olympic divers of Zimbabwe
Swimmers at the 1976 Summer Olympics
Divers at the 1980 Summer Olympics
Place of birth missing (living people)